Fatemeh Jamalifar (in Persian: فاطمه جمالی‌فر) (Born April 3, 1999 in Karaj) is a table tennis player and a member of the Iranian national team. She started her career in 2008 and achieved many successes. She entered the national arena in 2009 by joining the national non-halal team. The national table tennis team of Iran has been present. Jamalifar will be a member of Babak Kerman Municipality team in 2020 _ 2021 in the Adult Premier League.

Honors 
is an Iranian table tennis player. She ranked 1 in Iran in October 2016.
In Asian championship cup she lost to Liu Shiwen
She is the youngest champ in Iran though to become champ in October 2016.
Member of the national adult team in the Asian Games 2016 Thailand
Member of the national adult team in the Asian Games in China 2017
Member of the Adult National Team in the Asian Games in Indonesia 2018

References

External links 

1999 births
Living people
Iranian female table tennis players
People from Karaj
21st-century Iranian women